Brighton Toy and Model Museum (sometimes referred to as Brighton Toy Museum) is an independent toy museum situated in Brighton, East Sussex (registered charity no. 1001560). Its collection focuses on toys and models produced in the UK and Europe up until the mid-Twentieth Century, and occupies four thousand square feet of floor space within four of the early Victorian arches supporting the forecourt of Brighton railway station. Founded in 1991, the museum holds over ten thousand toys and models, including model train collections, puppets, Corgi, Dinky, Budgie Toys, construction toys and radio-controlled aircraft.

The display area includes large operational model railway layouts (in 0- and 00-gauge), and displays of period pieces from manufacturers and brands including Bing, Bassett-Lowke, Georges Carette, Dinky, Hornby Trains, Märklin, Meccano, Pelham Puppets and Steiff. It also includes individually engineered working models including a quarter-scale traction engine, steamroller and Spitfire fighter plane in the lobby.

Museum lobby 
Entrance to the first arch of the museum, containing the foyer/shop area and the Brighton Visitor Information Point, is free. This area provides free maps and brochures, and has a small "stocking filler" toy shop used by visiting school trips, secondhand books, and a set of "Collector's Market" cabinets containing collectables that are sold on a commission basis.

It also contains the "Glamour of Brighton" exhibition, whose Brighton-related models and displays include the Brighton Pavilion, Magnus Volk's electric and seashore electric railways, the old Brighton locomotive works, and the Brighton Belle Pullman train.

The largest exhibits in the foyer are a quarter-scale coal-fired traction engine, a large motorised Meccano Ferris wheel, and an overhead quarter-scale radio-controlled Spitfire model aircraft.

The first arch also contains offices and construction and restoration workshops that are not open to the public.

Ticketed main area 

The main area of the museum fills the next three arches and contains a large 1930s 0 gauge model railway layout, 00 gauge model railway town and countryside layouts, and collections of model locomotives, soft toys, puppets and marionettes, construction toys, building construction sets, model ships, radio controlled model aircraft, and farm, circus, zoo and ship toy sets. It also includes displays of diecast models including Matchbox, Dinky Toys, Corgi Toys and Spot-On.

Exhibition displays draw on outside guest collections and on varying selections taken from the Museum's core collection.

Events and temporary exhibitions
The museum is a venue for the Brighton Science Festival and the Brighton Fringe. Public train running days are typically held twice a year (Spring and Autumn), and the museum's Education section organises school visits with optional puppet shows and talks.

Temporary themed exhibitions usually coincide with an anniversary – 2012 exhibitions addressed the centenary of the launch and sinking of RMS Titanic (April to August), the centenary of the Leeds Model Company (September to October) the 75th anniversary of the 1937 Coronation Scot streamlined steam bullet-train (November to December).

Non-public areas

Workshop areas
As well as a carpentry workshop that produces the museum's cabinetry and displays, the museum also has a world-class toy repair and restoration workshop, with tinsmithing tools and its own sample library of parts and reference paint finishes.

Reference library
The reference library is the centre of most of the historical research that takes place in the museum, and a source of material for the museum's online knowledgebase.

Partnerships
The museum became the first community rail partner to Brighton Station in March 2013.

In 2013, the museum announced a twinning with the Rahmi M. Koç Museum, Istanbul.

Heritage Lottery Funded projects

"Toys in the Community" oral history project, 2014–16
A 2014 grant from the Heritage Lottery Fund supported "Toys in the Community: Valuing memories of dolls, teddy bears and construction toys", a two-year community outreach and oral history project.

Frank Hornby 150th anniversary project, 2012–2013

A 2012 grant from the Heritage Lottery Fund helped the museum to coordinate, publicise and organise celebrations and events during 2013 to mark the 150th anniversary of the birth of Frank Hornby.

The grant funded an expansion of the Museum's online coverage of Meccano, Hornby trains and Dinky Toys, a public wifi access point, and the installation and ongoing development of a touchscreen information system to allow members of the public to retrieve information on exhibits from around the museum.

The Brighton Toy and Model Index
The Brighton Toy and Model Index (ISSN 2399-1798) is an online resource on toys and models made up until around 1960, maintained and updated by the museum. The "Index" runs on the MediaWiki platform, and as of March 2018 has over seven thousand content pages and a similar number of images.

History

History of the building
The arches were built shortly after the 1841 railway station to support the station forecourt, with the space used to store beer barrels for a brewery, with the current museum entrance housing four dray horses and a corn storage silo. The structure is also one of a number of buildings in Brighton that are reputed to be haunted.

The space was acquired and renovated by the trust in 1990.

History of the museum
The museum was founded as a charitable trust in 1990 by Christopher Littledale, the museum's first and current Director, and opened in 1991.

In November 1998 the museum was forced to close for three years due to flooding caused by road-resurfacing work on the area in front of the station, which had interfered with a Victorian drainage system.

The museum reopened on 12 October 2001, after Railtrack funded repair works to waterproof the museum, and in November 2004 HRH Duke of Gloucester visited the museum and unveiled a commemorative plaque.

In November 2005 the museum was awarded £1,594.70 of grant money from the Surrey, East Sussex and West Sussex Museum Development Service's SEWS Museum Development Fund, to purchase computer equipment and create a database of specialist information about toys.

The museum launched a "Make History Fun" campaign in October 2005, with comedian and archaeologist Tony Robinson the campaign's patron.

Claire Eden was curator of the museum between September 2005 and December 2006, replacing Andrew Woodfield.

Local band Peggy Sue and the Pirates staged a short performance at the museum as part of the T Mobile phone network's The Great Escape Festival. 

Tony Robinson's visit to the museum on 1 June 2007 achieved extensive BBC News coverage.

The museum also appeared in The Argus on 29 June 2007 and the Brighton and Hove Leader on 5 July 2007, for a fairground exhibit that was displayed between July and October 2007.

The Brighton Belle Mural

The planned return of the Art Deco Brighton Belle all-electric Pullman train was celebrated on 23 September 2010 with a street party and the unveiling of a full-sized mural of a Pullman carriage by the Chairman of the 'Railway Heritage Trust and Museum Patron Sir William McAlpine. Inside the museum, the "Glamour of Brighton" exhibition was opened by the Mayor of Brighton and Hove, Councillor Geoffrey Wells.

The mural depicts the Brighton Belle waiting to leave Brighton Station and extends for the full length of the museum. Laurence Olivier, a regular traveller on the train, is pictured at one of the carriage windows.

25th Anniversary
The museum celebrated its 25th anniversary in 2016 with a special programme of events and a series of new exhibits, including an improved Meccano display and a new display of Nineteenth and Early Twentieth Century dollhouse miniatures.

Opening times 
The museum is usually closed on Mondays for maintenance work and cleaning, and for larger school visits that would be disruptive during normal public days. Its standard opening times are:

Admission to the shop area and information point is free. Admission to the museum area is ticketed and prices (as of August 2015) are: 

The building has been adapted for wheelchair users but the museum requests advance notice if any member of a party requires wheelchair access. 

School visits can be organised through the Education Officer. Advance notice is also requested for other group visits to avoid scheduling conflicts.

Governance

Brighton Toy And Model Museum is an independent, non-profit organisation and a registered charity. The museum's Trustees are:

 Vic Michel - Chairman
 Chris Littledale - Director/Founder
 Neil Bennett - Secretary
 Hugo Marsh, Milan Simek, Anthony Capo-Bianco, Peter Bryant, Ray Child

Television
The museum was featured in episode 2 of the Sky Atlantic series "Urban Secrets" (2012), in which Alan Cumming presented an unconventional view of Brighton.

Sources 
"Toy Museum Has A Brighter Outlook" from the Argus archives, first published Saturday 29 September 2001. Retrieved 23 November 2007.
"Happy Ending For Toy Story" from the Argus archives, first published Friday 5 November 2001. Retrieved 23 November 2007.
"A Feast Of Mini-Gigs" from the Argus archives, first published Tuesday 22 May 2007. Retrieved 23 November 2007.
"Museum Background" from the Brighton Toy and Model Museum website. Retrieved 23 November 2007.
Photogrammetry at Brighton Toy and Model Museum (August 2019) DOI: 10.13140/RG.2.2.32030.89920

References

External links 
 Brighton Toy and Model Museum (Google Places)
 Brighton Toy and Model Museum (Official website)
 Brighton Toy and Model Museum, Collections and Exhibits Knowledgebase ISSN 2399-1798
 BTMM Newsletter, 2011 (pdf)
 BTMM Newsletter, 2012 (pdf)
 Website for the 5BEL Trust, which is bringing back the Brighton Belle
 Brighton Toy and Model Museum (worthpoint.co.uk)
 Robert Nemeth, Building Opinions: Brighton Toy and Model Museum, Latest Homes magazines no.512 (8-14 Feb 2011)
 The Hornby Railway Collector magazine, No 458, November 2010 - cover article and two two-page spreads on the Museum, and Museum Director Chris Littledale
 Brighton Argus newspaper website, search results for published stories

Museums in Brighton and Hove
Museums established in 1991
Museums with wikis
Puppet museums
Railway museums in England
Toy museums in England
Model railway shows and exhibitions
1991 establishments in England
Puppetry in the United Kingdom